Total Zoo is an American family television program narrated by Andy Chanley. It was shown on the channel Animal Planet in 2000.

External links

Animal Planet original programming
2000 American television series debuts
2000 American television series endings